James Ray Blackburn (June 19, 1924 – October 26, 1969) was an American professional baseball pitcher who appeared in 18 games in Major League Baseball for the Cincinnati Reds in 1948 and 1951.

World War II veteran and POW
Blackburn's professional career began at age 17 in 1941, and was interrupted in 1943 by service in the United States Army. Attaining the rank of sergeant, Blackburn saw combat in the European Theatre of World War II. After he was liberated by advancing American troops in May 1945, he required months of hospitalization to regain his health.

Return to baseball
Blackburn was able to return to baseball in 1946. In July 1948 he was recalled to Cincinnati for his first major-league stint, and he appeared in 16 games, all in relief, for a second-division Reds' team. He proved to be highly effective through his first 11 games, but three rough September outings saddled him with two losses and inflated his earned run average from 1.59 to 4.18. Blackburn then missed the entire 1949 season. In 1950, he returned to baseball in the minor leagues, winning 21 games with a stellar 2.73 ERA in the Double-A Texas League. As a result, the Reds gave him a second trial in the early weeks of 1951, but he was ineffective in two appearances, posting a 17.18 ERA in only 3 innings pitched.

He resumed his career in the minors, where he played into the 1952 campaign, his last in baseball. In his 18 major-league games, all in relief, he compiled an 0–2 record and a 5.50 ERA, with no saves; in 36 innings pitched, he allowed 46 hits and 16 bases on balls, with 11 strikeouts. Jim Blackburn died in Cincinnati at the age of 45 on October 26, 1969.

References

External links

Bedingfield, Gary, "Jim Blackburn: Ballplayers Wounded in Combat," profile from Baseball in Wartime

1924 births
1969 deaths
Baseball players from Kentucky
Beaumont Roughnecks players
Cincinnati Reds players
Columbia Reds players
Cordele Reds players
Kansas City Blues (baseball) players
Major League Baseball pitchers
People from Warsaw, Kentucky
Syracuse Chiefs players
Tulsa Oilers (baseball) players
United States Army non-commissioned officers
United States Army personnel of World War II
World War II prisoners of war held by Germany